Contralmirante Villar is a province of the Tumbes Region in Peru. Its capital is the town of Zorritos.

The Cerros de Amotape National Park is located in this province, which is the largest in the Tumbes Region.

Geography

Boundaries
 North: Pacific Ocean
 East: Tumbes Province
 South: Talara Province (in the Piura Region)
 West: Pacific Ocean

Demographics

Largest towns
 Zorritos
 Cañaveral
 Cancas
 Acapulco
 Punta Sal

Beaches

The coast of the province harbors some of the most beautiful beaches in Peru. Although similar to those in northern Piura Region, the beaches of the Contralmirante Villar Province are considerably less crowded and urbanized.

The beaches in the town of Punta Sal are considered as some of the finest on the Peruvian coast due to their pure white sands, sun and warm weather all year long, and a sea ideal for water sports.

Political division
The Contralmirante Villar Province is divided into three districts (singular: distrito), each of which is headed by a mayor (alcalde). The districts, with their capitals in parenthesis, are:
 Casitas (Cañaveral)
 Zorritos (Zorritos)
 Canoas de Punta Sal (Canoas de Punta Sal)

Provinces of the Tumbes Region